Grevillea cravenii is a species of flowering plant in the family Proteaceae and is endemic to a small area along the north west coast of the Kimberley region of Western Australia. It is a spreading to weakly erect shrub with narrowly oblong leaves with lobed or toothed edges, and purplish-red to dark maroon flowers.

Description
Flowering occurs in December and January and the fruit is a hairy follicle.

Taxonomy
Grevillea cravenii was first formally described in 2000 by Robert Owen Makinson in the Flora of Australia, based on plant material collected by Matthew David Barrett in the Prince Regent River Reserve in 1999. The specific epithet (cravenii) honours Lyndley Craven.

Distribution and habitat
Grevillea cheilocarpa grows in grassy woodland where it is only known from the type location in the Prince Regent National Park.

Conservation status
This grevillea is listed as "Priority Two" by the Western Australian Government Department of Biodiversity, Conservation and Attractions, meaning that it is poorly known and from only one or a few locations.

See also
 List of Grevillea species

References

cravenii
Proteales of Australia
Eudicots of Western Australia
Endemic flora of Western Australia
Taxa named by Robert Owen Makinson
Plants described in 2000